Events from the year 1981 in Canada.

Incumbents

Crown 
 Monarch – Elizabeth II

Federal government 
 Governor General – Edward Schreyer
 Prime Minister – Pierre Trudeau
 Chief Justice – Bora Laskin (Ontario)
 Parliament – 32nd

Provincial governments

Lieutenant governors 
Lieutenant Governor of Alberta – Francis Charles Lynch-Staunton  
Lieutenant Governor of British Columbia – Henry Pybus Bell-Irving 
Lieutenant Governor of Manitoba – Francis Lawrence Jobin (until October 23) then Pearl McGonigal 
Lieutenant Governor of New Brunswick – Hédard Robichaud (until December 23) then George Stanley 
Lieutenant Governor of Newfoundland – Gordon Arnaud Winter (until July 10) then William Anthony Paddon 
Lieutenant Governor of Nova Scotia – John Elvin Shaffner 
Lieutenant Governor of Ontario – John Black Aird 
Lieutenant Governor of Prince Edward Island – Joseph Aubin Doiron 
Lieutenant Governor of Quebec – Jean-Pierre Côté
Lieutenant Governor of Saskatchewan – Irwin McIntosh

Premiers 
Premier of Alberta – Peter Lougheed  
Premier of British Columbia – Bill Bennett 
Premier of Manitoba – Sterling Lyon (until November 30) then Howard Pawley 
Premier of New Brunswick – Richard Hatfield
Premier of Newfoundland – Brian Peckford 
Premier of Nova Scotia – John Buchanan 
Premier of Ontario – Bill Davis 
Premier of Prince Edward Island – Angus MacLean (until November 17) then James Lee 
Premier of Quebec – René Lévesque
Premier of Saskatchewan – Allan Blakeney

Territorial governments

Commissioners 
 Commissioner of Yukon –  Douglas Bell
 Commissioner of Northwest Territories – John Havelock Parker

Premiers 
Premier of the Northwest Territories – George Braden
Premier of Yukon – Chris Pearson

Events
January 1 – Gasoline and diesel are sold by the litre rather than the gallon.
February 5 – More than three hundred men are arrested after police sweeps of Toronto bathhouses.  The arrests create an outcry among Canada's gay population, and become a historic turning point in Canadian LGBT history.
March 19 – Ontario election: Bill Davis's PCs win a majority.
June 4 – NABET employees at the Canadian Broadcasting Corporation hold a long strike, disrupting programming for much of the Spring.
July 17 – The government of British Columbia name a  peak in the Rocky Mountains after Terry Fox.
July 30 – The  section of the Trans-Canada Highway in Ontario where Terry Fox was forced to end his run, was renamed in his honour.
August – The prime rate hits a record high of 22.75%.
September 1 – Quebec's French-language sign law comes into effect.
September 1 – The Alberta and federal governments sign an energy agreement.
September – The Canadian Radio-television and Telecommunications Commission holds pay-TV hearings in Hull, Quebec.
September – West Edmonton Mall opens
October 16 – Canada Post becomes a crown corporation.
November 5 – In the Kitchen Accord, the federal government and all provinces except Quebec agree on how to patriate the Canadian Constitution.
November 13 – The Canadarm is first deployed aboard the Space Shuttle.
November 17 – James Lee becomes premier of Prince Edward Island, replacing Angus MacLean.
November 30 – Howard Pawley becomes premier of Manitoba, replacing Sterling Lyon.

Full date unknown
Power Corporation sells Canada Steamship Lines Inc. to Paul Martin and Laurence Pathy.
News media: Now created.

Arts and literature

New works
Margaret Atwood - True Stories
bill bissett  - Northern Birds in Coulour
W.O. Mitchell - How I Spent My Summer Holidays
Gordon R. Dickson - Lost Dorsai
Nancy Huston - Les Variations Goldberg
Joy Kogawa - Obasan

Awards
See 1981 Governor General's Awards for a complete list of winners and finalists for those awards.
Books in Canada First Novel Award: W.D. Valgardson, Gentle Sinners
Gerald Lampert Award: Elizabeth Allan, The Shored Up House
Marian Engel Award:
Pat Lowther Award: M. Travis Lane, Divinations and Short Poems 1973-1978
Stephen Leacock Award: Gary Lautens, Take My Family...Please!
Vicky Metcalf Award: Monica Hughes

Film
David Cronenberg's Scanners is released
James Cameron's Piranha II: The Spawning, his first directing effort, is released
Ladies and Gentlemen, The Fabulous Stains is released

Sport
March 2 – The Edmonton Drillers host Game 1 of the 1980–81 NASL indoor finals at Northlands Coliseum. They defeat the Chicago Sting 9–6.
March 5 – The Edmonton Drillers win the 1980–81 NASL indoor title in Chicago by defeating the Chicago Sting 5–4 in Game 2 of the finals.
March 15 – The Moncton Aigles Bleus win their first University Cup by defeating the Saskatchewan Huskies 4–2. The final game was played at the Stampede Corral in Calgary
May 10 – The Cornwall Royals win their third (second consecutive) Memorial Cup by defeating the Kitchener Rangers 8–2. The final game was played at Windsor Arena in Windsor, Ontario
May 13 – The original Montreal Allouettes cease operations
May 14 – Montreal Concordes are established 
May 21 – Saint Boniface, Manitoba's Butch Goring of the New York Islanders is awarded the Conn Smythe Trophy
July 21 – Quebec City's Rick Martel win his second World Wrestling Federation Tag Team Championship (with Tony Garea) by defeating the Moondogs in Allentown, Pennsylvania
September 26 – Toronto hosts Soccer Bowl '81 at Exhibition Stadium. 36,971 fans witness Chicago defeat New York 1–0 in a shoot-out.
September 28 – Calgary is awarded the 1988 Winter Olympics.
November 22 – The Edmonton Eskimos win their eighth (fourth consecutive) Grey Cup by defeating the Ottawa Redblacks 26–23 in the 69th Grey Cup played at Olympic Stadium in Montreal. London, Ontario's Neil Lumsden won the game's Most Valuable Canadian
November 28 – The Acadia Axemen win their second Vanier Cup by defeating the Alberta Golden Bears 18–12 in the 17th Vanier Cup played at Varsity Stadium in Toronto

Births
January 7 – Alex Auld, ice hockey player
January 8 – Jeff Francis, baseball pitcher
January 11 – Jonathan Mandick, rower
January 15 – Dylan Armstrong, shot putter
January 16 – Nic Youngblud, water polo player
January 17 – Julien Cousineau, alpine skier
January 20 – Owen Hargreaves, soccer player
January 21 – Dany Heatley, ice hockey player
February 13 – Kristina Kiss, soccer player
February 19 – Shawn Spears, pro wrestler
February 24 – Adam Kunkel, hurdler
March 14 – Isabelle Pearson, judoka
March 28 – Dan Petronijevic, actor
April 6 – Auburn Sigurdson, softball player
April 16 – Matthieu Proulx, football player
April 19 – Hayden Christensen, actor
May 8 – Blake Leibel, murderer
May 15 – Justin Morneau, baseball player
May 20 – Morgan Knabe, swimmer
June 4 – Jennifer Carroll, swimmer
June 21 – Kevin Mitchell, water polo player
June 23 – Mikey Bustos, Filipino Canadian entertainer
July 9 – Dylan Taylor, actor
July 13 – Michael Mando, actor, writer and director
July 21 – Anabelle Langlois, figure skater
July 23 – Steve Jocz, drummer
August 9 – Lauren Bay Regula, softball player
August 19 – Taylor Pyatt, ice hockey player
September 1 – Michael Adamthwaite, voice actor
September 7 
 Annie Martin, beach volleyball player
 Athena Karkanis, television, film and voice actress
September 13 – Angelina Love, professional wrestler
September 26 – Kaila Holtz, softball player
October 3 – Amanda Walsh, actress
October 4 – Justin Williams, ice hockey player
October 8 – Raffi Torres, ice hockey player
October 25 – Gary Reed, middle distance athlete
October 30 – Shaun Sipos, actor
November 4 – Paul Tucker comic-book artist 
November 20 – Christian Bernier, volleyball player

Deaths

January 5 - Lomer Brisson, politician and lawyer (b. 1916)
January 16 - John Oates Bower, politician, businessman and executive (b. 1901)
April 10 - George Carlyle Marler, politician, notary and philatelist (b. 1901)
May 4 - Samuel Rosborough Balcom, politician (b. 1888)
May 23 - David Lewis, lawyer and politician (b. 1909)
May 29 - Walter Russell Shaw, politician and Premier of Prince Edward Island (b. 1887)
June 28 - Terry Fox, humanitarian, athlete and cancer treatment activist (b. 1958)
September 23 - Dan George, actor and author (b. 1899)
November 3 - Thérèse Casgrain, feminist, reformer, politician and Senator (b. 1896)
December 28 - Allan Dwan, film director, producer and screenwriter (b. 1885)

See also
 1981 in Canadian television
 List of Canadian films of 1981

References

 
1981 in North America